Žena sa Balkana is the fourth studio album by Bosnian pop-folk singer Selma Bajrami. It was released in 2002.

Track listing
The album features 11 new songs and 9 old songs added on as bonus tracks.

New songs

Bonus tracks

References

2002 albums
Selma Bajrami albums
Nimfa Sound albums